Samuel Chouinard is a Canadian choreographer from Saint-Jean-sur-Richelieu, Quebec. Chouinard has been an artistic director of École de Danse Denise Bonneau since 2005.

Career
Chouinard works as a dancer, a dance teacher and a choreographer and he was trained in hip-hop, ballet, jazz and contemporary dance. He works closely with ice dance coaches Marie-France Dubreuil and Patrice Lauzon at :fr:Complexe récréatif Gadbois in  Montreal. Chouinard's other clients include Cirque du Soleil.

Choreographic career
Chouinard co-choreographed several programs for Tessa Virtue and Scott Moir, the two-time Olympic ice dance gold medalists. The notable ones are their Prince short dance for the 2016–2017 figure skating season and their 2018 Olympic free dance Moulin Rouge!. Chouinard choreographed several show programs for them, since 2014. He has involved in choreographing programs for three-time World ice dance champions Gabriella Papadakis & Guillaume Cizeron, two-time US ice dance champions Madison Hubbell and Zachary Donohue, and Olympic Gold medalist Nathan Chen.

References

Canadian choreographers
Living people
People from Saint-Jean-sur-Richelieu
Year of birth missing (living people)
Figure skating choreographers